Zdenko Jedvaj (born 13 January 1966) is a retired Bosnian player who played for several Croatian, Bosnian-Herzegovinian and Austrian clubs. His son Tin Jedvaj plays for Lokomotiv Moscow.

External links
 Stats at HRNogomet
 at forum.b92

1966 births
Living people
Sportspeople from Mostar
Croats of Bosnia and Herzegovina
Association football defenders
Yugoslav footballers
Bosnia and Herzegovina footballers
Croatian footballers
FK Velež Mostar players
NK Zagreb players
HNK Segesta players
HNK Rijeka players
DSV Leoben players
Yugoslav First League players
Croatian Football League players
2. Liga (Austria) players
Croatian expatriate footballers
Expatriate footballers in Austria
Croatian expatriate sportspeople in Austria